Canisius may refer to:

People
 Saint Peter Canisius (1521–1597), Dutch Jesuit Catholic priest
 Theodorich Canisius (1532–1606), Jesuit academic, half-brother of St. Peter Canisius
 Henricus Canisius (1562–1610), Dutch canonist and historian, nephew of St. Peter Canisius
 Aegidius of Viterbo (Ægidius Canisius), Italian humanist and cardinal 
 Canisius Thekkekara (1914–1998), Syrian Catholic priest

Schools
 Canisius College, a Jesuit college in Buffalo, New York
 Canisius Golden Griffins, the sports teams of Canisius College
 Canisius High School, a Jesuit private high school in Buffalo, New York
 Canisius Secondary School, a Jesuit run school in Monze, Zambia
 Jakarta Canisius College, a Jesuit junior and senior high school in Jakarta, Indonesia